World Osteoporosis Day is observed annually on 20 October, and launches a year-long campaign dedicated to raising global awareness of the prevention, diagnosis and treatment of osteoporosis and metabolic bone disease. Organized by the International Osteoporosis Foundation (IOF), 
the World Osteoporosis Day campaign is accompanied by community events and local campaigns by national osteoporosis patient societies from around the world with activities in over 90 countries.

History

World Osteoporosis Day was launched on October 20 1996 by the United Kingdom’s National Osteoporosis Society and supported by the European Commission. Since 1997, this awareness day has been organised by the International Osteoporosis Foundation.  In 1998 and 1999, the World Health Organization acted as co-sponsor of World Osteoporosis Day. The day also marks the launch of a year-long campaign to raise awareness of osteoporosis and metabolic bone disease. Since 1999 these campaigns have featured a specific theme.

Themes

1996: Awareness
1997: Awareness
1998: Awareness
1999: Early Detection
2000: Building Bone Health
2001: Bone Development in Youth
2002: Preventing a First Fracture
2003: Quality of Life
2004: Osteoporosis in Men
2005: Exercise
2006: Nutrition
2007: Risk Factors
2008: Advocate for Policy Change
2009: Advocate for Policy Change
2010: Signs and Symptoms of Spinal Fractures
2011: 3 Steps to Prevention: Calcium, Vitamin D and Exercise
2012: Stop at One: Make your First Break your Last
2013: Strong Women Make Stronger Women
2014: Real Men Build Their Strength from Within
2015: Serve Up Bone Strength
2016: Love Your Bones - Protect your Future
2017: Love Your Bones - Protect your Future

References

External links
World Osteoporosis Day
International Osteoporosis Foundation
International Osteoporosis Foundation in Hindi

 October observances
Osteoporosis